The Bug or Western Bug is a major river in Eastern Europe that flows through Belarus, Poland, and Ukraine, with a total length of .

The Bug is connected with the Dnieper by the Dnieper-Bug Canal.

History
According to Zbigniew Gołąb, the Slavic hydronym Bug as *bugъ/*buga derives from Indo-European verbal root *bheug- (having cognates in old Germanic word *bheugh- etc. with the meaning of "bend, turn, moves away"), with the hypothetical original meaning of "pertaining to a (river) bend", and derivatives in Russian búga ("low banks of a river, overgrown with bushes"), Polish bugaj ("bushes or woods in a river valley or on a steep river bank"), and Latvian bauga ("marshy place by a river").

Traditionally, e.g. by the drafters of the Curzon Line, the Bug River has been considered to be the ethnographical border between the East and West as well as the border between Orthodox (Ukrainians, Belarusians) and Catholic (Poles) peoples. 

The Bug was part of the frontier between the slices of Poland occupied by Austria and Russia after the Third Partition of Poland in 1795, the southern half of the eastern border of the Duchy of Warsaw (1809-1815), Congress Poland (1815-1867), of the Vistula Land (1867-1913), and of the Regency Kingdom of Poland (1917-1918). The Bug also formed part of the dividing line between German Wehrmacht and Soviet Red Army zones specified in a secret clause of the German–Soviet Frontier Treaty of 28 September 1939 following the September 1939 invasion of Poland in the Second World War.

Geographic characteristics

The Bug is a left tributary of the Narew. It flows from the Lviv Oblast in the west of Ukraine northwards into the Volyn Oblast, before passing along the Ukraine-Polish and Polish-Belarusian border and into Poland, where it follows part of the border between the Masovian and Podlaskie Voivodeships. It joins the Narew at Serock, a few kilometers upstream of the artificial Zegrze Lake.

This part of the Narew between the confluence and the Vistula is sometimes referred to as Bugo-Narew but on December 27, 1962, the Prime Minister of Poland's act abolished the name "Bugo-Narew", soon after Zegrze Lake was completed.

On the Bug, a few kilometers from the Vysokaye in Kamenets District of the Brest Region, is the westernmost point of Belarus. It is also connected with the Dnieper via the Mukhavets, a right-bank tributary, by the Dnieper-Bug Canal.

Basin

Somewhat more than a quarter,  or 29%, is in Belarus, and a bit under a quarter,  or 22% lies in Ukraine.

The climate of the Bug basin is temperate.

The basin experiences annual high-water levels during spring flooding due to thawing snow, after which a low flow period starts and lasts until October or mid-November. Occasional summer floods often occur in the headlands, where mountains influence favorable flash-flood conditions. In Autumn the water level increases are inconsiderable; in some years they do not happen at all. The resultant water levels are changeable due to the instability of ice cover.

Flooding

Significant floods during the last 60 years in Belarus were registered in 1958, 1962, 1967, 1971 and 1974. The largest spring flood was observed in 1979, when the maximum water discharge was 19.1 cubic metres per second on 24 March 1979, at the village of Chersk; 166 cubic metres per second near the village of Tyukhinichi (Lyasnaya river) on 31 March 1979; and 269 cubic metres per second near Brest on 1 April 1979. A similar spring flood occurred in 1999 when the spring run-off in March–May exceeded the average annual value by almost half again (48%).

The last time the Bug flooded in Poland and Ukraine was in 2010 and the last time it flooded in Belarus was in 1999.

Tributaries

Photo gallery

See also

References

Notes

Sources

External links

  Bug in the Geographical Dictionary of the Kingdom of Poland (1880)

Belarus–Poland border
Belarus–Ukraine border
Poland–Ukraine border
Border rivers
Borders of Belarus
Borders of Poland
Borders of Ukraine
 
International rivers of Europe
Natura 2000 in Poland
Rivers of Belarus
Rivers of Brest Region
Rivers of Lublin Voivodeship
Rivers of Lviv Oblast
Rivers of Masovian Voivodeship
Rivers of Podlaskie Voivodeship
Rivers of Poland
Rivers of Volyn Oblast